Keith John Ashfield  (March 28, 1952 – April 22, 2018) was a Canadian politician. He served as the member of Parliament (MP) for the electoral district of Fredericton from 2008 to 2015 and, before that, was a member of the New Brunswick Legislature from 1999 to 2008. He served in the federal cabinet in various capacities from 2008 to 2013.

Early life
The son of Jack Ashfield and Nora Locke, he studied Business at the University of New Brunswick for two years.

Political career

Provincial
Ashfield was a school trustee for a number of years and was first a candidate for the Legislative Assembly of New Brunswick in the 1991 election.  A Progressive Conservative, Ashfield placed third with Confederation of Regions candidate Max White being victorious.

Ashfield was again a candidate in 1999 and was successful, defeating cabinet minister Joan Kingston in the riding of New Maryland.  He was named deputy speaker of the Legislature. Ashfield faced Kingston again in 2003 and won again though by a closer margin. He was sworn in as Minister of Natural Resources & Energy on June 27, 2003. He was elected to a third term in 2006 in the redistributed district of New Maryland-Sunbury West, however he left the cabinet as his party formed the opposition following the election.

On March 6, 2018, Ashfield ran for the Progressive Conservative nomination in Oromocto-Lincoln-Fredericton. The nomination ultimately went to Mary Wilson.

Federal
On November 7, 2007, he won the nomination to be the candidate of the Conservative Party of Canada in Fredericton for the next federal election. When the election was called, he resigned his provincial seat. He was elected in the 2008 federal election and re-elected in the 2011 federal election. Ashfield was appointed Minister of Fisheries and Oceans on May 18, 2011.

Ashfield co-chaired the annual meeting of the Canadian Council of Fisheries and Aquaculture Ministers (CCFAM) in Victoria, British Columbia in 2012. Ministers discussed a range of issues such as aquaculture, aquatic invasive species, and protecting Canada's fisheries.

In March 2013, Ashfield faced criticism for a photo-op during which he remarked to the teenage daughter of a constituent, "Grace, you’re a great cook. You’re going to make a wonderful wife for somebody."  Later that year, he was replaced as Minister of Fisheries and Oceans, and left the Cabinet.

He was defeated in the 2015 federal election.

Personal life and death
In October 2012, Ashfield had a heart attack and temporarily gave his role to then National Revenue Minister Gail Shea. In June 2013, Ashfield announced he had been diagnosed with Hodgkin's lymphoma. When he declared his candidacy for the 2015 Canadian federal election, he had beaten his cancer that had returned in Fall 2014.

The Progressive Conservative Party of New Brunswick officially announced Keith Ashfield's death in the early afternoon of April 22, 2018.

Electoral history

References

External links

1952 births
2018 deaths
Progressive Conservative Party of New Brunswick MLAs
Members of the Executive Council of New Brunswick
Politicians from Fredericton
Conservative Party of Canada MPs
Members of the 28th Canadian Ministry
Members of the King's Privy Council for Canada
Members of the House of Commons of Canada from New Brunswick
University of New Brunswick alumni